This is a list of schools in Dorset, England.

State-funded schools

Primary and first schools

 The Abbey CE Primary School, Shaftesbury
 All Saints CE Primary School, Bishops Caundle
 Archbishop Wake CE Primary School, Blandford Forum
 Atlantic Academy Portland, Isle of Portland
 Beaminster St Mary's Academy, Beaminster
 Beechcroft St Pauls CE Primary School, Weymouth
 Bere Regis Primary and Pre-School, Bere Regis
 Bincombe Valley Primary School, Littlemoor
 Blandford St Mary CE Primary School, Blandford St Mary
 Bovington Academy, Bovington Camp
 Bridport Primary School, Bridport
 Bridport St Mary's CE Primary School, Bridport
 Broadmayne First School, Broadmayne
 Broadwindsor CE Primary School, Broadwindsor
 Buckland Newton CE Primary School, Buckland Newton
 Burton Bradstock CE School, Burton Bradstock
 Cerne Abbas CE First School, Cerne Abbas
 Charmouth Primary School, Charmouth
 Cheselbourne Village School, Cheselbourne
 Chickerell Primary Academy, Chickerell
 Colehill First School, Colehill
 Conifers Primary School, Westhaven, Weymouth
 Corfe Castle CE Primary School, Corfe Castle
 Cranborne CE First School, Cranborne
 Damers First School, Poundbury
 Downlands Community School, Blandford Camp
 Dunbury CE Academy, Winterborne Whitechurch
 Durweston CE Primary School, Durweston
 Ferndown First School, Ferndown
 Frome Valley CE First School, Crossways
 Gillingham Primary School, Gillingham
 Greenford CE Primary School, Maiden Newton
 Hampreston CE First School, Hampreston
 Hayeswood First School, Colehill
 Hazelbury Bryan Primary School, Hazelbury Bryan
 Henbury View First School, Corfe Mullen
 Hillside Community First School, Verwood
 Holy Trinity CE Primary School, Weymouth
 Loders CE Primary Academy, Loders
 Lulworth and Winfrith CE Primary School, West Lulworth
 Lytchett Matravers Primary School, Lytchett Matravers
 Manor Park CE VC First School, Dorchester
 Marshwood CE Primary Academy, Marshwood
 Milborne St Andrew First School, Milborne St Andrew
 Milldown CE Academy, Blandford Forum
 Milton-On-Stour CE Primary School, Milton on Stour
 Motcombe CE Primary School, Motcombe
 Oakhurst Community First School, West Moors
 Okeford Fitzpaine CE School, Okeford Fitzpaine
 Pamphill First School, Pamphill
 Parley First School, Ferndown
 Parrett and Axe CE Primary School, Mosterton
 Piddle Valley CE First School, Piddletrenthide
 Pimperne CE Primary School, Pimperne
 Portesham CE Primary School, Portesham
 Powerstock CE Primary School, Powerstock
 The Prince of Wales School, Poundbury
 Puddletown CE First School, Puddletown
 Radipole Primary School, Weymouth
 Rushcombe First School, Corfe Mullen
 St Andrew's CE Primary School, Fontmell Magna
 St Andrew's CE Primary School, Preston
 St Andrew's CE Primary School, Yetminster
 St Augustine's RC Primary School, Weymouth
 St Catherine's RC Primary School, Bridport
 St George's CE Primary School, Langton Matravers
 St Georges CE School, Bourton
 St George's Community Primary School, Portland
 St Gregory's CE Primary School, Marnhull
 St Ives Primary School, St Ives
 St James' CE First School, Alderholt
 St James' CE First School, Gaunt's Common
 St John's CE First School, Wimborne Minster
 St John's CE Primary School, Weymouth
 St Mark's CE Primary School, Swanage
 St Mary and St Joseph's RC Primary School, Wool
 St Mary the Virgin CE Primary School, Gillingham
 St Mary's CE First School, Charminster
 St Mary's CE First School, West Moors
 St Mary's CE Primary School, Bradford Abbas
 St Mary's CE Primary Academy, Thorncombe
 St Mary's RC First School, Dorchester
 St Mary's RC Primary School, Marnhull
 St Mary's RC Primary School, Swanage
 St Michael's CE Primary School, Lyme Regis
 St Nicholas & St Laurence CE Primary School, Broadwey
 St Nicholas CE Primary School, Child Okeford
 Salway Ash CE Primary School, Salway Ash
 Sandford St Martin's CE First School, Sandford
 Shaftesbury CE Primary School, Shaftesbury
 Sherborne Abbey CE Primary School, Sherborne
 Sherborne Primary School, Sherborne
 Shillingstone CE Primary School, Shillingstone
 Sixpenney Handley First School, Sixpenny Handley
 Southill Primary School, Weymouth
 Spetisbury CE Primary School, Spetisbury
 Stalbridge CE Primary School, Stalbridge
 Sticklands CE Primary School, Evershot
 Stoborough CE VA School, Stoborough
 Stower Provost Community School, Stour Provost
 Sturminster Marshall First School, Sturminster Marshall
 Swanage Primary School, Swanage
 Symondsbury CE Primary School, Symondsbury
 Thorner's CE School, Litton Cheney
 Thornford CE Primary School, Thornford
 Three Legged Cross First School, Three Legged Cross
 Trent Young's CE Primary School, Trent
 Trinity CE First School, Verwood
 Upton Infant School, Upton
 Upton Junior School, Upton
 Verwood CE First School, Verwood
 Wareham St Mary CE Primary School, Wareham
 William Barnes Primary School, Sturminster
 Wimborne First School, Wimborne
 Wimborne St Giles CE First School, Wimborne St Giles 
 Winterbourne Valley CE First School, Winterbourne Abbas
 Witchampton CE First School, Witchampton
 Wool CE Primary School, Wool
 Wyke Primary School, Gillingham
 Wyke Regis CE Junior School, Wyke Regis
 Wyke Regis Infant School and Nursery, Wyke Regis

Middle schools

Allenbourn Middle School, Wimborne Minster
Cranborne Middle School, Cranborne
Dorchester Middle School, Dorchester
Emmanuel Church of England Middle School, Verwood
Ferndown Middle School, Ferndown
Lockyer's Middle School, Corfe Mullen
St Mary's Church of England Middle School, Puddletown
St Michael's Church of England Middle School, Colehill
St Osmund's Church of England Middle School, Dorchester
West Moors Middle School, West Moors

Secondary and upper schools

All Saints Church of England Academy, Wyke Regis
Atlantic Academy Portland, Isle of Portland
Beaminster School, Beaminster
The Blandford School, Blandford Forum
Budmouth Academy, Chickerell
Dorset Studio School, Dorchester
Ferndown Upper School, Ferndown
Gillingham School, Gillingham
The Gryphon School, Sherborne
Lytchett Minster School, Lytchett Minster
The Purbeck School, Wareham
Queen Elizabeth's School, Pamphill
Shaftesbury School, Shaftesbury
The Sir John Colfox Academy, Bridport
Sturminster Newton High School, Sturminster Newton
The Swanage School, Swanage
The Thomas Hardye School, Dorchester
Wey Valley Academy, Weymouth
The Woodroffe School, Lyme Regis

Special and alternative schools

Beaucroft Foundation School, Colehill
The Compass, Weymouth
Dorchester Learning Centre, Winterborne Monkton
The Forum Centre, Blandford Forum
Harbour School Dorset, Bovington Camp
Harbour Vale School, Sherborne
Mountjoy School, Beaminster
Westfield Arts College, Preston
Wyvern Academy, Weymouth
Yewstock School, Sturminster Newton

Further education
Kingston Maurward College, Dorchester
Weymouth College, Weymouth

Independent schools

Primary and preparatory schools

Castle Court School, Corfe Mullen
Dumpton School, Wimborne Minster
Hanford School, Child Okeford
Knighton House School, Durweston
Port Regis School, Motcombe
Sherborne Preparatory School, Sherborne
Sunninghill Preparatory School, Dorchester
Thornlow Preparatory School, Weymouth
Yarrells Preparatory School, Upton

Senior and all-through schools
Bryanston School, Bryanston
Clayesmore School, Iwerne Minster
Leweston School, Sherborne
Milton Abbey School, Milton Abbas
Ringwood Waldorf School, Ashley
Sherborne School, Sherborne
Sherborne School for Girls, Sherborne

Special and alternative schools
Arbour House School, Weymouth
The Beeches School, Cranborne
The Forum School, Shillingstone
Graduately-Developing-Futures, Lytchett Matravers
The Luccombe Hub, Milton Abbas
Purbeck View School, Swanage
Sheiling School, Ashley Heath

External links
 Performance tables for Dorset schools

Dorset
Schools
List